Scathophaginae is a subfamily of dung flies in the family Scathophagidae. There are at least 30 genera and 130 described species in Scathophaginae.

Genera
These 33 genera belong to the subfamily Scathophaginae:

 Acanthocnema Becker, 1894 i c g
 Acerocnema Becker, 1894 i c g
 Allomyella Malloch, 1923 i c g
 Brooksiella Vockeroth, 1987 i
 Bucephalina Malloch, 1919 i c g
 Ceratinostoma Meade, 1885 i c g b
 Chaetosa Coquillett, 1898 i c g
 Cordilura Fallen, 1810 i g b
 Cordylurella Malloch, 1919 i c g b
 Cosmetopus Becker, 1894 i c g
 Dromogaster Vockeroth, 1995 i
 Ernoneura Becker, 1894 i c g
 Gimnomera Rondani, 1866 i c g
 Gonarcticus Becker, 1894 i c g
 Gonatherus Rondani, 1856 i c g
 Huckettia Vockeroth, 1995 i
 Hydromyza Fallen, 1813 i c g b
 Megaphthalma Becker, 1894 i c g
 Megaphthalmoides Ringdahl, 1936 i c g
 Microprosopa Becker, 1894 i c g
 Nanna Becker, 1894 i g
 Neorthacheta Vockeroth, 1987 i c g
 Norellisoma Hendel, 1910 i c g
 Okeniella Hendel, 1907 i c g
 Orthacheta Becker, 1894 i c g
 Peratomyia Vockeroth, 1987 i
 Pleurochaetella Vockeroth, 1965 i c g
 Pogonota Zetterstedt, 1860 i c g
 Scathophaga Meigen, 1803 i g b
 Spaziphora Rondani, 1856 i c g b
 Staegeria Rondani, 1856 i c g
 Synchysa Vockeroth, 1987 i
 Trichopalpus Rondani, 1856 i c g

Data sources: i = ITIS, c = Catalogue of Life, g = GBIF, b = Bugguide.net

References

Further reading

External links

Scathophagidae
Articles created by Qbugbot
Brachycera subfamilies